The 2010–11 Argentine Torneo Argentino A was the sixteenth season of third division professional football in Argentina. A total of 24 teams competed; the champion was promoted to Primera B Nacional.

Club information

Zone A (South)

1 Play their home games at Estadio José María Minella.

Zone B (Centre)

Zone C (North)

First stage

Zone A

Zone B

Zone C

Second stage

Reválida Stage

Zone A

Zone B

Zone C

Third stage

Fourth stage

Fifth stage

Sixth stage

Promotion/relegation playoff B Nacional-Torneo Argentino A

Desamparados was promoted to 2011–12 Primera B Nacional by winning the playoff and San Martin (T) was relegated to 2011–12 Torneo Argentino A

Relegation Matches

|-
!colspan="5"|Relegation/promotion playoff 1

|-
!colspan="5"|Relegation/promotion playoff 2

Defensores de Belgrano (VR) was promoted to 2011–12 Torneo Argentino A by winning the playoff and Estudiantes (RC) was relegated to 2011–12 Torneo Argentino B.
Alumni (VM) remained in the Torneo Argentino A by winning the playoff.

See also
2010–11 in Argentine football

References

Torneo Argentino A seasons
3